The Monark 540 is a  sailboat. It has four beds and a small kitchen under one of the beds.

History
The Monark 540 was designed by Pelle Petterson for Monark in 1972.

References

Keelboats
1970s sailboat type designs
Sailboat type designs by Swedish designers
Sailboat types built in Sweden
Sailing yachts designed by Pelle Pettersson